The western pygmy possum (Cercartetus concinnus), also known as the southwestern pygmy possum or the mundarda, is a small marsupial found in Australia.  Genetic studies indicate its closest relative is probably the eastern pygmy possum, from which its ancestors diverged around eight million years ago.

Taxonomy 
John Gould provided the first description of Cercartetus concinnus, which was read before the Zoological Society of London and published in 1845. Gould assigned the new species to the genus Dromicia, recognising an affinity with a previously described species found in Tasmania. The animal was also described in the same year as Phalangista (Dromicia) neillii by G. R. Waterhouse, recognised as a synonym of the species.

Description
The western pygmy possum is unusual in Cercartetus, as, unlike its grey relatives, the fur over most of its body is a bright cinnamon colour. It has pure white underparts, which also distinguishes it from its relatives, and has a thin ring of dark brown fur in front of the eyes. It possesses long and rounded flesh-coloured ears, large and black protruding eyes. The muzzle is only sparsely covered in hair, showing the pink colour at the bare parts.  The species has long whiskers. The prehensile tail is long and covered with fine scales, rather than fur, and not enlarged at the base. The hind feet have opposable first digits, while all four feet have broad pads at the tips of the toes.

Although small compared with most other possums, it is one of the larger pygmy possums, with adults ranging from 70–100 millimetres in head-body length with a tail 70–90 mm long. Adult weight ranges from 8 to 18 grams. The female has a well-developed pouch, opening to the front, containing six teats. At up to 12 mm in length, the tongue is unusually large for such a small animal.

Distribution and habitat
This possum is vulnerable due to habitat loss and lack of food. The distribution range includes Southwest Australia, on the south coast and the wheatbelt, and areas of South Australia, Kangaroo Island, and Victoria south to Edenhope. It is also found in far southwestern New South Wales, where it is listed as endangered. It inhabits semi-arid woodland, shrubland, and heath, dominated by plants such as Callistemon (bottlebrushes), melaleuca, banksia, and grevillea. Although there had been previously thought to be two subspecies, separated in distribution by the Nullarbor Plain, genetic studies have not revealed any significant difference between the eastern and western populations. Furthermore, while the species is no longer native to the area, fossils from the Nullarbor Plain region are known.

Behaviour and diet
The western pygmy possum is solitary and nocturnal. During the day, they shelter in tree hollows or other natural crevices, birds' nests, or dense vegetation. At night, they travel in search of food or mates, typically moving around  each day, and they may migrate to different areas over the course of a year, depending on local plant resources. They spend most of their time in the trees, using their grasping paws and prehensile tails to grip onto branches, grasp nest materials, and open flowers to access nectar. They have been described as making a rapid chattering noise.

It feeds primarily on nectar and pollen, especially from plants such as melaleuca and eucalyptus, and may play a role in the pollination. It also supplements its diet with insects. Native predators include quolls, snakes, and owls, although in modern times, the animal also falls prey to introduced carnivores such as red foxes and domestic cats.

Western pygmy possums have the ability to enter torpor during inclement or cold weather, enabling them to conserve energy and food reserves. During bouts of torpor, which may last for up to seven days at a time, body temperature falls to within one degree Celsius of ambient, and oxygen consumption to just 1% of normal. They sleep on their fronts, with their ears folded over their eyes, and their long tails coiled beneath their bodies. Compared with other mammals of similar size, they rouse from torpor unusually quickly.

Reproduction
Western pygmy possums can breed throughout the year, although they do so more commonly in the spring, and give birth to litters of four to six young. The mother often carries more than six embryos at a time in her womb, but because she has only six teats, and marsupial young remain attached to an individual teat for much of their early lives, six is the maximum number she is able to rear. Unusually, however, the mother may give birth just two days after weaning a previous litter, with her teats dramatically changing in size to accommodate the smaller young, and the mammary glands reverting to production of colostrum.

The young are still blind when they leave the pouch at around 25 days of age; they initially remain within the nest, and are fully weaned at around 50 days. Females reach sexual maturity at 12 to 15 months old.

Conservation
The species is currently classified as Least Concern by the IUCN. However, several Australian states (New South Wales and South Australia) and individual parks and conservation regions have nationally listed it as Vulnerable, Endangered or Critically Endangered due to the pressure from vegetation clearing, the reduction of food sources (overgrazing of livestock), fire regimes, and introduced predators such as the red fox and feral cats.

References

External links
Western Wildlife including photo
Images: skulls (including C. concinnus) on Museum Victoria website
Images: Australian mammal images (including C. concinnus) on Museum Victoria website

Possums
Marsupials of Australia
Endemic fauna of Australia
Mammals of Western Australia
Mammals of South Australia
Mammals of New South Wales
Mammals of Victoria (Australia)
Mammals described in 1845
Taxa named by John Gould